Suvratoxumab (INN; development code MEDI4893) is a human monoclonal antibody designed for the prevention of nosocomial pneumonia caused by Staphylococcus aureus.

This drug was developed by MedImmune

References 

Monoclonal antibodies
AstraZeneca brands